Rodino may refer to:
Peter W. Rodino (1909–2005), American politician
Rodino (rural locality), several rural localities in Russia